United States gubernatorial elections were held in 1803, in 12 states.

Seven governors were elected by popular vote and five were elected by state legislatures.

Ohio held its first gubernatorial election on achieving statehood.

Results

See also 
1803 United States elections

References

Notes

Bibliography